Microsoft SQL Server Express is a version of Microsoft's SQL Server relational database management system that is free to download, distribute and use. It comprises a database specifically targeted for embedded and smaller-scale applications. The product traces its roots to the Microsoft Database Engine (MSDE) product, which was shipped with SQL Server 2000.  The "Express" branding has been used since the release of SQL Server 2005.

Microsoft SQL Server Express LocalDB is a version of Microsoft SQL Server Express, on-demand managed instance of the SQL Server engine. It is targeted to developers, and has the following restrictions: up to 10 GB database size and only local connections (network connections are not supported).

Capabilities 
SQL Server Express provides many of the features of the paid, full versions of Microsoft SQL Server database management system.  However it has technical restrictions that make it unsuitable for some large-scale deployments.  Differences in the Express product include:

 Maximum database size of 10 GB per database in SQL Server 2019, SQL Server 2017, SQL Server 2016, SQL Server 2014, SQL Server 2012, and 2008 R2 Express (4 GB for SQL Server 2008 Express and earlier; compared to 2 GB in the former MSDE). The limit applies per database (log files excluded); but in some scenarios users can access more data through the use of multiple interconnected databases.
 No SQL Server Agent service 
 Artificial hardware usage limits:
 Single physical CPU, but multiple cores allowable
 1 GB of RAM (runs on a system with higher RAM amount, but uses only at most 1 GB per instance of SQL Server Database Engine. "Recommended: Express Editions: 1 GB All other editions: At least 4 GB and should be increased as database size increases to ensure optimal performance."). Express with Advanced Services has a limit of 4 GB per instance of Reporting Services (not available on other Express variants). Analysis Services is not available for any Express variant.

Unlike the predecessor product, MSDE, the Express product does not include a concurrent workload-governor to "limit performance if the database engine receives more work than is typical of a small number of users."

SQL Server Express includes several GUI tools for database management. These include:

 SQL Server Management Studio  since 2012 SP1; before that, only a stripped-down version called SQL Server Management Studio Express is provided
 SQL Server Configuration Manager
 SQL Server Surface Area Configuration tool
 SQL Server Business Intelligence Development Studio

The predecessor product MSDE generally lacked basic GUI management tools,

Features available in SQL Server "Standard" and better editions but absent from SQL Server Express include:

 Analysis Services
 Integration Services
 Notification Services

LocalDB 

SQL Server Express LocalDB announced at 2011.

This version supports silent installation, requires no management and it is compatible with other editions of SQL Server at the API level.

LocalDB runs as non-admin user, requires no configuration or administration.

LocalDB limits to local system only and supports no remote connections. To connect this version it is needs special connection string.

It is possible create several instances of the LocalDB for different applications.
Default instance names 'SqlLocalDB'.

Variants 
Microsoft makes SQL Server Express N1 available as:

 An integrated edition with management tools
 Core database-engine only
 A SQL Server Express with Advanced Services edition (first introduced relatively late in Q2 2006 compared to the original release) with a reduced-functionality version of SQL Server Reporting Services and with full-text search capabilities

In the Free 2005 Express version, for example, a standard approach to installation options was provided, as follows.
Generally, the SQL 2005 Express installers are packaged with the following consistent naming convention:

 SQLEXPR.EXE Has installers for BOTH 32-bit and 64-bit processors, but is a basic install
 SQLEXPR32.EXE Has ONLY the installer for 32-bit processors (still the basic install)
 SQLEXPRWT.EXE Has installers for BOTH 32-bit and 64-bit processors and SQL Server Management Studio Express (SSMSE) (2008 R2)
 SQLEXPR_ADV.EXE Has the basics and SQL Server Management Studio Express (SSMSE) + Reporting and Full Text Queries
 SQLEXPR_TOOLKIT.EXE Has the basics and SSMSE and Business Intelligence Development Studio (BIDS)

These optional variants have gone through several service packs (SP), and each SP installer can be used without using the older ones first:

 Originals of the above files all carry the version number 9.0.1399.6
 Service Pack 2 (SP2) versions all carry the version number 9.0.3042
 Service Pack 3 (SP3) versions all carry the version number 9.00.4035
 Service Pack 4 (SP4) versions all carry the version number 9.00.5000

 SqlLocalDB.msi Microsoft® SQL Server Express LocalDB Installer.
 SQLLocalDB.exe CLI Microsoft® SQL Server Express LocalDB (LocalDB manipulation tool).

Version history 

Does not include Windows Server 2016 "Essentials" Edition

See also
 SQL Server Compact
 MSDE
 SQLite
 Microsoft SQL Server
 Microsoft Servers
 List of relational database management systems
 Comparison of relational database management systems

References

External links
 Microsoft SQL Server Express downloads
 Microsoft SQL Server Express documentation
 SQL Server 2012 Comparison of features by edition
 SQL Server Express WebLog
 Hardware and Software Requirements for Installing SQL Server 2012
 Hardware and Software Requirements for Installing SQL Server 2014

Proprietary database management systems
Microsoft server technology
Microsoft database software